Barbarian is a full-service creative digital advertising agency headquartered in New York City. Since 2001, Barbarian has been creating the future faster and transforming brands through creativity, innovation and technology. Barbarian specializes in digital transformation and experiences, digital brand strategy, digital ecosystems, social media and commerce, and data-driven analysis. The agency is guided by an unwavering commitment to inclusive and courageous innovation and a focus on the future. Barbarian is a Cheil Worldwide company, a publicly traded South Korean holding company.

Past campaigns include the Subservient Chicken for Burger King, Mucinex Sickwear, Fenty Eau De Parfum Ghost Stores Launch, JBL + Doja Cat partnership, Crystal Pepsi Returns, GE Droneweek and the Reimagine VR Experience for Etihad, the airline industry's first VR experience. 

In 2020, Barbarian was the seventh organization to achieve 3% Certification, an independent assessment system led by The 3% Movement to support agencies in their effort to retain and promote women into leadership. Agencies are evaluated on three key pillars: female leadership, workplace equality and culture, and equal creative opportunities. The certification process involved qualitative and quantitative data intake and analysis, including employee interviews, anonymous surveys, work and awards credits, agency salary data and more.

Software
In 2010, Barbarian’s in-house team built Cinder, an open source coding language for the creative community to program graphics, audio, video, networking, image processing and computational geometry.  It was built for their Samsung Centerstage project, which allows consumers to interact with Samsung appliances in an immersive retail experience. Cinder won the inaugural Grand Prix for Innovation Lion at Cannes in 2013.

Unique Offerings
In 2022, Barbarian announced the launch of Barbarian Innovation Labs to ensure its clients reach consumers most effectively across Web3 — in the metaverse, AR/VR and other new tech-driven spaces. 

Led by the agency’s technologists, strategists and creators, Barbarian Innovation Labs will guide clients to new avenues of growth by helping define the playbook for success in the omniverse, which includes the full spectrum of seamless offline to online customer experiences, led by the metaverse. 

In 2022, the digital creative agency is also launching Barbarian Data as a Service (DaaS), powered by Tealium’s Customer Data Platform (CDP), which provides one place to collect and activate first-party customer data across marketing and analytics tools.

Core Capabilities

App, Website & Emerging Experience (AR-VR-AI-Voice) Design & Development
Digital Transformation & Roadmap Planning
Digital Brand Strategy, Design & Campaigns
Data Driven Digital Ecosystems & eCommerce
Experience Design
Digital Product & Service Innovation
Social Commerce & Content Marketing
Tech Stack Analysis & Consulting
Strategic Consulting, Research & Intelligence
Data & Analytics

Awards
 2021 - Contagious Magazine — Mucinex Sickwear — World’s Greatest Ideas
 2021 - D&AD Pencils — Mucinex Sickwear — eCommerce - Livestream — Wood Pencil 
 2021 - Digiday Awards — Fenty Ghost Stores — Best Product Launch Campaign — Winner
 2021 - The Drum Social Media Awards — Mucinex Sickwear — Retail or Commerce — Winner
 2021 - The Drum Experience Awards — Fenty Ghost Stores — Pivot Initiative of the Year — Winner
 2021 - London International Awards — Mucinex Sickwear — Social Media & Influencers - Livestream — Bronze
 2021 - PR News Digital Awards — Mucinex Sickwear — Campaigns & Products Winner for Influencer Campaign — Winner
 2021 - PR News Digital Awards — Mucinex Sickwear — Best Use of YouTube Winner for Marketing or PR Campaign — Winner
 2021 - PRovoke SABRE Innovation Awards — Mucinex Sickwear — Healthcare / Pharmaceutical / Health-tech — Winner
 2021 - PRovoke SABRE Innovation Awards — Mucinex Sickwear — Best Use of Social Network — Winner
 2021 - PRovoke SABRE Innovation Awards — Mucinex Sickwear — Best in Show — Winner
 2021 - Shorty Awards — Mucinex Sickwear — Healthcare/Pharma — Bronze
 2021 - Shorty Impact Awards — AdCouncil AdoptUSKids You Can’t Imagine the Reward — Youth & Family —  Silver
 2021 - Webbys — Samsung Galaxy S21 5G Series — Websites & Mobile Sites - Best Navigation/Structure — People's Voice Winner
 2021 - Webbys — Samsung Galaxy S21 5G Series —  Websites & Mobile Sites - Best Visual Design - Function — People's Voice Winner
 2022 - Clios — Fenty Eau De Parfum Ghost Stores — Fashion & Beauty Marketing — Silver
 2022 - The Drum Digital Advertising Awards — Fenty Eau De Parfum Ghost Stores — Best Sell Side Innovation — Winner
 2022 - Digiday Content Marketing Awards — Fenty Eau De Parfum Ghost Stores — Best Community Building Campaign Category — Winner
 2022 - Digiday Content Marketing Awards — Fenty Eau De Parfum Ghost Stores — Most Engaged Brand Community Category — Winner
 2022 - Shorty Awards — Fenty Eau De Parfum Ghost Stores — Globalization — Winner
 2022 - Shorty Awards — Fenty Eau De Parfum Ghost Stores — Multicultural Community Management —Silver
 2022 - Shorty Awards — Fenty Eau De Parfum Ghost Stores — Storytelling — Bronze
 2022 - Shorty Awards — Fenty Eau De Parfum Ghost Stores — Digital Pivot — Bronze
 2022 - Shorty Awards — Fenty Eau De Parfum Ghost Stores — Globalization — Audience Honore

References

External links
Official Website
Cinder Website
Online Marketing Solutions

Marketing companies of the United States